Lula Ali Ismaïl is a Djibouti-Canadian film director and screenwriter. She is the first woman from Djibouti to produce a film, earning her the nickname of "the first lady of the Djibouti cinema." The directed the 27-minute fiction short Laan (2011). The film was screened at the 2012 Montreal Vues d'Afrique festival, and in 2013 at FESPACO. In 2014 she started working on a feature film, Dhalinyaro, co-written with Alexandra Ramniceanu and Marc Wels. The film, Djibouti's first feature film, premiered in July 2017.

Biography
Ali Ismail was born in Djibouti in 1978 to an Issa family, and in 1992 settled in Montreal, Quebec, Canada, as part of a wave of immigrants who left the poor and politically unstable African country. The youngest of eight children, she studied office automation, and worked as a legal assistant for seven years, but developed an interest in the world of acting and cinema, and began to take courses on the subject. At first, she played minor roles at several television series in Quebec, but found more interest in filmmaking.

Work
In 2012, Ali Ismail created her opera prima, a short film (27 minutes) called Laan (Friends), a story about Souad, Oubah and Ayane, three young women in Djibouti who chew on qat and seek love. Ali Ismail also played one of the lead roles in it. The film described everyday life in her country. It was the first film directed by a woman from Djibouti. Ali Ismail relates that the funds needed for this film were raised mainly with the help of her family and friends. When she arrived in Djibouti, she contacted the Ministry of Culture for support, but the government did not have a budget for such projects. Nevertheless, she carried on with the project, thus setting the cornerstone of a film industry in the country. The film has been shown at different festivals in Africa, Europe and North America, and has been well received by the critics.

In 2014, Ali Ismail filmed her first full-length movie, Dhalinyaro (Youth). The film follows three young women from different socio-economic backgrounds. It was supported by the Organisation internationale de la Francophonie, and was co-produced in Canada, Somalia, France and Djibouti, where it was filmed in its entirety. The film was premiered in 2017 in Djibouti, and it was attended by the ministers of Education, Communication and Culture.

Filmography
 Laan, 2011
 Dhalinyaro / Jeunesse [Youth], 2017

References

External links
 

Djiboutian women
Djiboutian film directors
Djiboutian emigrants to Canada
Canadian women film directors
1978 births
Living people
Film directors from Montreal